The Colorado Consistory No. 1, also known as the Scottish Rite Masonic Center is a Masonic building in Denver, Colorado near the State Capitol building.

It was designed by architect William Norman Bowman for the Denver Scottish Rite chapter.

It is a three-story building which was built during 1923–25, and was completed and dedicated in 1925.

It is also known as Scottish Rite Masonic Temple.

References

Masonic buildings in Colorado
Buildings and structures in Denver
1925 establishments in Colorado
Buildings and structures completed in 1925